Glycosmis longisepala is a tree of Borneo in the family Rutaceae. The specific epithet  is from the Latin meaning "long sepal".

Description
Glycosmis longisepala grows as a small tree.

Distribution and habitat
Glycosmis longisepala is endemic to Borneo where it is confined to Mount Pueh in Sarawak.

References

longisepala
Trees of Borneo
Endemic flora of Borneo
Flora of Sarawak
Plants described in 1985
Taxonomy articles created by Polbot